DDD is the seventh album by American alternative rock band Poster Children, released in 2000.  It derives its name from the SPARS Code for a digitally recorded, mixed, and mastered album.

Critical reception
In its 4-star review, The Austin Chronicle wrote that "Rick Valentin's lyrics are sharp-edged and hard-sung as ever, he and brother Jim's guitars bouncing off each other like crossed chainsaws." Spin called the album "an energetic look at life-time employment in a young person's game, coloring bemusement and revulsion with ba-ba verses and who-gives-a-damn choruses."

Track listing
 "This Town Needs a Fire" – 2:36
 "Strange Attractors" – 3:30
 "Daisy Changed" – 3:26
 "Zero Stars" – 2:02
 "Time Share" – 2:50
 "Rock & Roll" – 1:27
 "Persimmon" – 2:15
 "Elf" – 2:33
 "The Old School and the New" – 3:52
 "Judge Freeball" – 2:41
 "Silhouette" – 3:10
 "Perfect Product" – 2:39
 "Peck N'Paw" – 5:00

Personnel
Rick Valentin – Vocals, Guitar
Rose Marshack – Bass, vocals
Jim Valentin – Guitar
Howie Kantoff – Drums

References

Poster Children albums
2000 albums